Edwin Lawrence "Eddie" Johnson (December 11, 1920 – April 7, 2010) was an American jazz and blues tenor saxophonist.

Early life 
Johnson was born in Napoleonville, Louisiana, and moved with his family to Chicago at the age of two. As a teenager, Johnson sang in a vocal group. He graduated from Englewood High School and attended Wilson Junior College. In 1938, he and his bandmates were recruited to play for Kentucky State College, where Johnson received a scholarship and attended for eight months.

Career 
In 1946, Johnson joined trumpeter Cootie Williams and His Orchestra, appearing on several Capitol and Majestic recordings, until leaving to join Louis Jordan and His Tympany Five. He also played with Ella Fitzgerald and Duke Ellington. In 1981 and 1999, he released albums of new material, the latter on Delmark.

Discography
 Indian Summer (Nessa, 1981)
 Love You Madly (Delmark, 1999)

With Jodie Christian
Front Line (Delmark, 1996)

With James Moody
 Last Train from Overbrook (Argo, 1958)

References

1920 births
2010 deaths
People from Napoleonville, Louisiana
American rhythm and blues musicians
American jazz saxophonists
American male saxophonists
African-American saxophonists
Jump blues musicians
Nessa Records artists
Delmark Records artists
Jazz musicians from Louisiana
American male jazz musicians
20th-century African-American people
21st-century African-American people
20th-century American saxophonists
Jazz musicians from Chicago
Jazz musicians from Illinois